Vietnamese Golden Ball, also referred to as Vietnamese Footballer of the Year, is an annual association football award for the best performances of Vietnamese footballer over the previous year. Presented since 1995 by Sài Gòn Giải Phóng Newspaper. The first winner was striker Le Huynh Duc. Since 2001, It also awards Young Player of the Year, Best Woman Player of the year and Best Foreign Player of the year. The current holder of the award, as selected in 2019, is Hanoi's midfielder Đỗ Hùng Dũng.

Best Man Player of the year

Wins by player

Wins by club

Best Woman Player of the year

Futsal

Young Player of the Year

Best Foreign Player of the year

Most favorite players

References

External links
History of Vietnamese Golden ball at Sài Gòn Giải Phóng newspaper  Part :1, 2, 3, 4, 5, 6.

 
Vietnamese football trophies and awards
Association football player of the year awards by nationality
1995 establishments in Vietnam
Awards established in 1995
Annual events in Vietnam